Marcus Edvin Bergholtz (born 15 December 1989 in Örkelljunga) is a Swedish footballer who plays as a midfielder.

Career
He began his career in Ekets GoIF in his home village of Eket, near Örkelljunga in northern Skåne. Bergholtz was then recruited to Helsingborgs IF for the 2004 season. In 2007, Bergholtz went on a trial at Premier League club West Ham, who were interested in buying him, but when the club did not agree to Helsingborg's demands, the deal ran aground. He made his debut from the start in the Allsvenskan match between Helsingborgs IF and IFK Göteborg on 4 October 2008 and played 13 matches for HIF during the 2008 season.

In January 2020, Bergholtz was recruited by Division 1 club Lindome GIF.

References

External links

Marcus Bergholtz at Lagstatistik

1989 births
Living people
People from Örkelljunga Municipality
Swedish footballers
Swedish expatriate footballers
Sweden youth international footballers
Allsvenskan players
Superettan players
Eliteserien players
Ettan Fotboll players
Helsingborgs IF players
Stabæk Fotball players
Östers IF players
Ängelholms FF players
Utsiktens BK players
GAIS players
Swedish expatriate sportspeople in Norway
Expatriate footballers in Norway
Association football midfielders
Footballers from Skåne County